Chinese Physics B is a monthly peer-reviewed scientific journal published in English by IOP Publishing. It is sponsored by the Chinese Physical Society and the Institute of Physics, Chinese Academy of Sciences.

Scope
Chinese Physics B is devoted to rapid publication of original research papers, rapid communications, and reviews on the latest developments and achievements in all branches of physics worldwide except nuclear physics, as well as the physics of elementary particles and fields. Specific areas of interest include condensed matter physics, quantum information, atomic and molecular physics, optical physics, and plasma physics.

History 
The journal was established in 1992 as Acta Physica Sinica (Overseas Edition), publishing papers different from those of "Acta Physica Sinica" (in Chinese) in both language and content. The journal title was changed to Chinese Physics in 2000, and changed to Chinese Physics B in 2008.

Abstracting and indexing 
This journal is abstracted and indexed in Science Citation Index, Materials Science Citation Index, Scopus, Inspec, Compendex, NASA Astrophysics Data System Stanford Physics Information Retrieval System, and VINITI Database RAS/Referativny Zhurnal. According to the Journal Citation Reports, the journal has a 2020 impact factor of 1.494.

References

External links
 

Physics journals
English-language journals
Monthly journals
Publications established in 1992
IOP Publishing academic journals
Chinese Physical Society academic journals